Pentaceros is a genus of marine ray-finned fish, armorheads from the family Pentacerotidae. They are native to the Pacific, Indian, and eastern Atlantic Oceans. Pentaceros is the only genus in the monotypic subfamily Pentacerotinae.

Species
The currently recognized species in this genus are:
 Pentaceros capensis G. Cuvier, 1829 (Cape armorhead)
 Pentaceros decacanthus Günther, 1859 (big-spined boarfish)
 Pentaceros japonicus Steindachner, 1883 (Japanese armorhead)
 Pentaceros quinquespinis Parin & Kotlyar, 1988
 Pentaceros richardsoni A. Smith, 1844 (pelagic armorhead)
 Pentaceros wheeleri (Hardy, 1983) (slender armorhead)

References

External links
Smith, J.L.B. 1964. Fishes of the family Pentacerotidae. Ichthyological Bulletin; No. 29. Department of Ichthyology, Rhodes University, Grahamstown, South Africa.

 
Pentacerotidae
Taxa named by Georges Cuvier